Salsipuedes is a 2016 Panamanian drama film directed by Ricardo Aguilar Navarro and Manuel Rodríguez. It was selected as the Panamanian entry for the Best Foreign Language Film at the 89th Academy Awards but it was not nominated.

Cast
 Elmis Castillo as Andrés Pimienta
 Maritza Vernaza as Eloísa
 Jaime Newball as Bobby Pimienta
 Lucho Gotti as Esteban Pimienta

See also
 List of submissions to the 89th Academy Awards for Best Foreign Language Film
 List of Panamanian submissions for the Academy Award for Best Foreign Language Film

References

External links
 

2016 films
2016 drama films
Panamanian drama films
2010s Spanish-language films